Swindell or Swindells is a surname. Notable people with the name include:

Government
A. B. Swindell (born 1945), American politician
Charles Swindells, former United States Ambassador to New Zealand and Samoa (2001-2005)

Sports
Greg Swindell (born 1965), American former Major League Baseball player
Herbert 'Bert' Swindells (1909-2001), English footballer
Jackie Swindells (1937-2009), English footballer
Robert Swindell (born 1950), English retired cricketer
Sammy Swindell (born 1955), American race car driver

Others
Cole Swindell (born 1983), American country music singer-songwriter
Michael Swindells, British police officer stabbed to death in 2004
Robert Swindells, British children's writer
Steve Swindells (born 1952), English singer, songwriter, keyboardist, club promoter and journalist

See also
Swindall
Swindle (surname)

English toponymic surnames